Maria Marten, or the Mystery of the Red Barn is a 1913 British silent drama film directed by Maurice Elvey. It was based on the 1827 Red Barn Murder. The story of Maria Marten was a popular stage melodrama of the Victorian era, and five films based on the story were made between 1902 and 1935.

As of August 2010, the film is missing from the BFI National Archive, and is listed as one of the British Film Institute's "75 Most Wanted" lost films.

Plot
A Suffolk squire murders a young pregnant woman who had demanded that he must marry her.

Cast
 Elisabeth Risdon as Maria Marten
 Fred Groves as William Corder
 Douglas Payne as Roger Deaves
 Nessie Blackford as Mary Marten
 A. G. Ogden as Tom Marten
 Mary McKenzie as Mary Moore
 Maurice Elvey as Captain Matthews

See also
 List of lost films

References

External links

British Film Institute 75 Most Wanted entry, with extensive notes

1913 drama films
1910s historical drama films
1913 lost films
British historical drama films
British silent feature films
British black-and-white films
Films directed by Maurice Elvey
Films set in Suffolk
Lost British films
Lost drama films
Films about murder
Films set in 1827
1910s British films
1910s crime drama films
Silent crime drama films